Jobet is a surname. Notable people with the surname include:

Juan Carlos Jobet (born 1975), Chilean politician 
Julio César Jobet (1912–1980), Chilean Marxist historian